Power Rangers: Super Legends is an action-adventure video game based on the television franchise Power Rangers. It was released on October 23, 2007 for the Nintendo DS and on November 6, 2007 for the PlayStation 2 and for Microsoft Windows.

Synopsis

PlayStation 2, PC 
Long thought to have been purified by Zordon's energy wave at the end of Power Rangers in Space, Lord Zedd has reappeared in his old form. Concealed in a hidden dimension, he is interfering with the time stream, trying to alter the course of history to destroy every Power Ranger throughout time. Operating from the Hall of Legends, the new/Future Omega Ranger (confused with the original one and himself) must gather a force of Power Rangers and artifacts from across time to break through into Zedd's hidden dimension and restore the timeline.

Nintendo DS 
Emperor Gruumm has set his sights upon the myth of the Hall of Legends, the resting place of the collected energies of Power Rangers across time. In his twisted mind, he envisioned a world where his enemy's power is not only stolen but used against them and to make him a living God over all creation. The Omega Ranger, aware of all timelines from within the Hall of Legends, discovers his plan and warns the Power Rangers to stand against it. For should the Hall of Legends fall into Gruumm's hands, all would be lost.

Game features 
The game marks an anniversary gathering of selectable Power Rangers from fifteen seasons of the series, from Mighty Morphin Power Rangers to Power Rangers Operation Overdrive, from Rangers to Megazords (only the Dino Thunder and Mystic Force seasons are not represented). There are 16 playable characters on the Nintendo DS and 21 on the PlayStation 2 and PC. The dimensions in this game are somewhat similar to the 1994 SNES video game,  Mighty Morphin' Power Rangers.

The game has been described as a blend of puzzle, action, and mission-based adventures ranging from one to two players.

Screencaps of the DS version revealed appearances by Zedd, and Gluto, as well as featuring locations such as Angel Grove and an "Ancient Ranger" temple.

A Nintendo Gamecube version of the game, which would be the same as the PS2/PC versions, was planned but abandoned.

The Mercury Ranger, Magna Defender, Green Samurai Ranger, Green Power Ranger, and the spirits of Forever Red (Red Power Ranger, Red Alien/Aquitian Ranger, Red Zeo Ranger, Red Turbo Ranger, Red Space Ranger, Red Galaxy Ranger, Red Lightspeed Ranger, Red Time Force Ranger, Quantum Ranger, and Red Wild Force Ranger) appear as non-player helper characters from the DS Version.

Playable Characters in Console Version 

Mighty Morphin Power Rangers
 Jason Lee Scott - MMPR Red Ranger
 Kimberly Ann Hart - MMPR Pink Ranger
 Billy Cranston -  MMPR Blue Ranger
 Trini Kwan - MMPR Yellow Ranger
Power Rangers Lost Galaxy
 Leo Corbett - Galaxy Red Ranger
 Damon Henderson - Galaxy Green Ranger
 Kai Chen - Galaxy Blue Ranger
Power Rangers Wild Force
 Cole Evans - Red Wild Force Ranger
 Merrick Baliton - Lunar Wolf Ranger

Power Rangers Ninja Storm
 Tori Hanson - Blue Wind Ranger
 Hunter Bradley - Crimson Thunder Ranger
 Blake Bradley - Navy Thunder Ranger
 Cameron Watanabe - Green Samurai Ranger
Power Rangers S.P.D.
 Jack Landors - S.P.D. Red Ranger
 Elizabeth Delgado - S.P.D. Yellow Ranger
 Anubis Cruger - S.P.D. Shadow Ranger
 Sam - S.P.D. Omega Ranger
Power Rangers Operation Overdrive
 Mack Hartford - Red Overdrive Ranger
 Will Aston - Black Overdrive Ranger
 Dax Lo - Blue Overdrive Ranger

Playable Characters in DS Version 

Mighty Morphin Power Rangers
 Jason Lee Scott - MMPR Red Ranger
 Kimberly Ann Hart - MMPR Pink Ranger
Power Rangers Zeo
 Tommy Oliver - Zeo Ranger V Red
Power Rangers Lost Galaxy
 Damon Henderson - Galaxy Green Ranger
 Kai Chen - Galaxy Blue Ranger
Power Rangers Time Force
 Lucas Kendall - Time Force Blue Ranger
 Trip - Time Force Green Ranger
 Eric Myers - Quantum Ranger

Power Rangers Wild Force
 Danny Delgado - Black Wild Force Ranger
 Alyssa Enrilé - White Wild Force Ranger
Power Rangers Ninja Storm
 Shane Clarke - Red Wind Ranger
 Dustin Brooks - Yellow Wind Ranger
Power Rangers S.P.D.
 Jack Landors - S.P.D. Red Ranger
 Sky Tate - S.P.D. Blue Ranger
 Sam - S.P.D. Omega Ranger
 Boom - S.P.D. Orange Ranger
Power Rangers Operation Overdrive
 Mack Hartford - Red Overdrive Ranger
 Will Aston - Black Overdrive Ranger

Reception

References

External links 
 
Power Rangers: Super Legends (NDS) | (PC) | (PS2) at GameSpot
Power Rangers: Super Legends (NDS) | (PC) | (PS2) at IGN

2007 video games
Disney video games
Nintendo DS games
PlayStation 2 games
Power Rangers video games
Superhero video games
Superhero crossover video games
Video games developed in Canada
Video games developed in the United States
Video games featuring female protagonists
Video games about parallel universes
Video games with cel-shaded animation
Windows games
Behaviour Interactive games
Video games set in California